Carlos Ignacio Carrillo Contreras (November 5, 1940 – March 4, 1994) was a Mexican Luchador, or professional wrestler, known under the ring name Aníbal. Carrillo made his debut in November 1963, and adopted the enmascarado character (masked) Aníbal, named after the Carthaginian general Hanibal, in 1965. Carrilo's career peaked in the late 1960s and the 1970s as he worked for Empresa Mexicana de Lucha Libre and the Universal Wrestling Association, winning a number of championships. Carrillo was unmasked after losing a Lucha de Apuesta (bet fight) to Máscara Año 2000 on December 13, 1991. Carrillo retired from wrestling in 1993 and died from a brain tumor in 1994. El Hijo de Aníbal (Spanish for "the Son of Aníbal") is billed as Aníbal's son, but it has never been confirmed if he is indeed the son of Carrillo or if he paid for the rights to use the name, a practice not uncommon in Lucha Libre.

Professional wrestling career
Carrillo began training for a professional wrestling career at the age of 20, training in Gimnasio Baños Gloria and at the Gimnasio San Francisco de Portales under the tutelage of Chico Fernández and Salvador Flores. He made his professional wrestling debut in November 1963 and earned 40 pesos for the match. After wrestling for two years Carrillo was convinced by friends in the business that he needed to become an enmascarado, or masked wrestler, since young wrestlers who were popular wore masks. Carrillo came up with the name "Aníbal", after the Cartagenia general Hanibal who had crossed the alps and almost defeated the Roman Empire. Carrillo was given a blue mask, trunks and boots and became the highflying tecnico ("good guy" or Face), quickly earning the nicknames El Guerrero Cartaginés ("The Carthagenian Warrior") and La Saeta Azul ("The Blue Arrow"); later he was also referred to as La Furia Azul ("The Blue Fury")

During his early days as Aníbal Mil Mascaras and Black Shadow acted as his padrinos or mentors. In 1966 Aníbal won the Distrito Federal Light Heavyweight Championship, then lost it to Pepe Casas as he signed a contract with Empresa Mexicana de Lucha Libre (EMLL). He spent the next couple of years working his way up the ranks in EMLL, honing his high flying skills into a top level competitor. 1970 was Aníbal's breakthrough year. He defeated Mashio Koma to win the NWA World Middleweight Championship on December 6, 1970, and was named El Halcón Magazine's "1970 Wrestler of the year". Aníbal's run with the NWA Middleweight title lasted over a year and saw him successfully defend the title in several high-profile main events. During his title reign Aníbal developed a heated rivalry with René Guajardo, a rivalry that saw the two face off in several main events all around Mexico. On March 30, 1973, Guajardo ended Aníbal's NWA Middleweight title reign. On June 28, 1974, Aníbal defeated Adorable Rubí to win the Mexican National Middleweight Championship in the main event of a show in Mexico City, Mexico. On September 20, Aníbal became a double champion, defeating El Cobarde in a match for the vacant NWA World Middleweight Champiohship. Aníbals run as a double champion ended when he lost the Mexican National Middleweight Title on November 29, 1974, to Ringo Mendoza. His success in the ring saw him named "Wrestler of the year" in 1974.

In May 1975, Francisco Flores and Ray Mendoza left EMLL to form a rival wrestling promotion called the Universal Wrestling Association (UWA). Aníbal was among the group of young wrestlers that left EMLL to join the UWA, vacating the NWA World Middleweight Championship in the process. In the UWA Aníbal continued his rivalry with René Guajardo, losing to Guajardo in the finals of the tournament to crown the first UWA World Middleweight Champion. It was not until 1977 that Aníbal was able to win the UWA Middleweight title as he defeated Guajardo on October 2, 1977. He retained the championship until February 11, 1979, when Jungla Negra pinned him to win the title. By the early 1980s Aníbal's popularly was still high, especially as he teamed with Villano III and El Solitario to form a trio called Los Tres Caballeros ("The three gentlemen"). The trio feuded extensively with La Ola Blanca Dr. Wagner and Ángel Blanco until Aníbal turned against his partners and El Solitario ended up teaming up with Dr. Wagner. This was the first time in his career that Aníbal had worked as a rudo ("bad guy" or Heel character) in his career. Aníbal had a series of very intense, very bloody matches against El Solitario in a storyline that drew full houses whenever it was on the card and that was headed for a very high-profile Lucha de Apuesta (Bet match) between the two with their masks on the line. Before the two could face off in the Apuesta match Solitario died suddenly. Following the abrupt ending to the storyline with El Solitario Aníbal defeated El Texano to win the vacant UWA World Junior Light Heavyweight Championship. Aníbal travelled to Puerto Rico to take part in WWC's 11th Anniversary celebrations. On September 15, 1984, he lost the UWA WOrld Junior Light Heavyweight Championship to Invader III, but would regain it not long afterward. During his time in Puerto Rico Aníbal also won the WWC World Junior Heavyweight Championship. On January 1, 1985, Aníbal lost the UWA World Junior Light Heavyweight title to Negro Navarro and then disappeared from the wrestling scene. The years of working full-time had taken its toll on Carrillo's body, forcing him out of the ring due to a multitude of injuries.

Mask loss and retirement
Carrillo returned in late 1990 and began working for Consejo Mundial de Lucha Libre (CMLL; the renamed EMLL). The years away from the ring and cumulative injuries had taken its toll as he was not nearly as mobile as before but still commanded respect due to his history. Carrillo returned to wrestling to get a big payday for losing his mask in an Apuesta match as he needed the money. The original plan was for Aníbal to lose his mask to Universo 2000, a wrestler CMLL was building up to be a main eventer, in the featured match of the 1991 Juicio Final'' ("Final Justice"). Those plans were changed when promoter Benjamin Mora, who was bitter at CMLL for not working with him, revealed several of CMLL's plans including who was going to unmask Aníbal. CMLL decided to change their plans and in the end it was Máscara Año 2000, Universo 2000's brother that unmasked Aníbal on December 13, 1991. Not long after the mask loss Carillo retired, but returned in 1993 to wrestle a series of matches because he needed the money. By the end of 1993 Carrillo was in such poor physical shape he was forced to retire from wrestling for good. Om October 24, 1993, Carrillo was on hand as El Hijo del Aníbal ("The son of Aníbal") made his professional wrestling debut. It has never been confirmed if El Hijo del Aníbal is indeed the son of Carrillo or if he paid for the rights to use the name, a practice not uncommon in Lucha Libre.

Death
Carlos Carrillo died on March 4, 1994, from a brain tumor. El Hijo de Aníbal died at 50 on January 23, 2021, from complications of COVID-19.

Championships and accomplishments
Comisión de Box y Lucha Libre Mexico D.F.
Distrito Federal Light Heavyweight Championship (1 time)
Empresa Mexicana de Lucha Libre
Mexican National Middleweight Championship (1 time)
NWA World Middleweight Championship (2 times)
El Halcón Magazine
Wrestler of the year: 1970, 1974
Panama
European Middleweight Championship (1 time)
Universal Wrestling Association
UWA World Junior Light Heavyweight Championship (2 times)
UWA World Middleweight Championship (1 time)
World Wrestling Council
WWC World Junior Heavyweight Championship (1 time)

Luchas de Apuestas record

Footnotes

References

1940 births
1994 deaths
20th-century professional wrestlers
Deaths from brain cancer in Mexico
Masked wrestlers
Mexican male professional wrestlers
Professional wrestlers from Michoacán
Mexican National Middleweight Champions
NWA World Middleweight Champions
UWA World Junior Light Heavyweight Champions
UWA World Middleweight Champions